Elite Systems is a British video game developer and publisher established in 1984 as Richard Wilcox Software. It is known for producing home computer conversions of popular arcade games.  Elite also published compilations of games on the Hit-Pak label and budget price re-releases on the Encore label.

History
Under the name Richard Wilcox Software, only one title was published: Blue Thunder for the ZX Spectrum, Atari 8-bit and Commodore 64. In August 1984, the group was relaunched as Elite Systems, expanding the team to include graphic designers Rory Green and Jon Harrison; programmers Neil A. Bate, Chris Harvey, Andy Williams and Stephen Lockley; administrators Paul Smith and Pat Maisey; and Wilcox's brother Steve handled sales and marketing. Its first release under the new Elite Systems label was Kokotoni Wilf, which also carried the first of their anti-counterfeiting holograms on the cassette inlay card.

By 1986, the company was developing many home computer licenses of arcade machines. Their Aldridge-based headquarters housed a row of arcade cabinets for games that were being converted. Their hardware had been hacked so the team could analyse the games to ensure an accurate, licensed conversion. Three of their conversions, Commando, Ghosts 'n Goblins and Paperboy, were among the UK's top ten best-selling home video games of 1986.

At the 1986 Golden Joystick Awards, Elite was awarded "Software House of the Year" by Computer and Video Games magazine and received a "Game of the Year" award for Paperboy from the British software industry the following year.

Elite launched its first budget label, £2.99 Classics in July 1986 achieving chart success with re-releases of older titles from other software houses such as Scuba Dive, Full Throttle and Skool Daze. The label was closed before the end of the year when developers took legal action against the company for non-payment of royalties.  A new budget label, Encore, was launched in 1988 with its first 5 titles, Airwolf, Bomb Jack, Battleships, Saboteur, and Frank Bruno's Boxing all coming from Elite's back-catalogue.

Elite Systems began creating video games for the NES and Game Boy in the early 1990s through its associated development house MotiveTime.

In 2010, the company began selling versions of classic ZX Spectrum games licensed from the original developers for iOS and Android systems and in January 2014 they announced plans to crowdfund a Spectrum-themed bluetooth keyboard, the Recreated ZX Spectrum, that would attach to mobile devices. Elite Systems took down the ZX Spectrum: Elite Collection app the following month, due to complaints from authors that they had never been paid royalties. Steve Wilcox responded in a statement on their website where he claimed he was "working towards" making all outstanding payments with 28 days and that the games were being withdrawn from sale in the meantime.

In April 2014, it was reported that Elite Systems had fully repaid the overdue royalties and cancelled the contracts it had with the unpaid developers.

Wired described the finished device, which was styled as an original Spectrum 48k keyboard, as "absolutely gorgeous" but said it was ultimately more of an expensive novelty than an actual Spectrum. In July 2019, Eurogamer reported that many of the orders had yet to be delivered due to a dispute between Elite Systems and their manufacturer, Eurotech.

List of mobile games
All-new Paperboy - In Development
Double Dragon II: The Revenge
R-Type
Atlantis Quest
Double Dragon EX
Paperboy
Star Warriors
Alien vs. Predator
Bombjack
Chuckie Egg

List of older games

1942
3DC
911TS
A Question of Sport
Ace
Ace 2
Airwolf
Airwolf 2
Aquablast
Battleships
Batty
Beyond the Ice Palace
Blue Thunder
Bomb Jack
Bomb Jack II
Buggy Boy
Chain Reaction
Combat Lynx
Commando
Complete Onside Soccer
Deep Strike
Dirt Racer
Dogs of War
Dr. Franken (titled The Adventures of Dr. Franken for the SNES in the United States)

Dr. Franken II
Dragon's Lair
Dragon's Lair: The Legend
Dukes of Hazzard
European Championship 1992
The Fall Guy
First Strike
Ford Racing
Frank Bruno's Boxing
Ghosts 'n Goblins
Great Gurianos
Grand National
Grand Touring
Gremlins 2: The New Batch
Harrier Attack
Hoppin' Mad
Ikari Warriors
Joe & Mac
Kokotoni Wilf
Last Battle
Live And Let Die
Mighty Bomb Jack
Mike Read's Computer Pop Quiz
Nintendo Soccer
On The Tiles
Onside Complete Soccer

Overlander
Paperboy
Passing Shot
Roller Coaster
Scooby-Doo
Space Academy
Space Harrier
Spitfire
Storm Warrior
Strikepoint
Striker (with Rage Software)
Supertrux
Test Drive: Off-Road
The Fidgetts
ThunderCats
Tournament Golf
Virtuoso
Wanderer 3D
World Championship Soccer
World Cup Striker

References

External links 
 Official website

Companies based in Lichfield
Golden Joystick Award winners
Video game companies established in 1984
Video game companies of the United Kingdom
Video game development companies
Video game publishers